Willyama was an electoral district for the Legislative Assembly in the Australian State of New South Wales named after the original aboriginal name for the Broken Hill area. It included southern Broken Hill and sparsely occupied areas further south. Since 1904 all of the town was in the district of Broken Hill, surrounded by the rural district of Sturt. In the 1912 redistribution north Broken Hill was in Sturt, while Willyama was created to include South Broken Hill, the southern part of Sturt and the north western part of Murray. In 1920, it was combined with Sturt, Cobar and much of the area of Murray to create a three-member Sturt. Willyama's only member was Jabez Wright representing .

Members for Willyama

Election results

References

Former electoral districts of New South Wales
1913 establishments in Australia
Constituencies established in 1913
1920 disestablishments in Australia
Constituencies disestablished in 1920